KFG may refer to:

 Kardinal-Frings-Gymnasium, a school in Bonn, Germany
 Kaiserin-Friedrich-Gymnasium, a school in Bad Homburg vor der Höhe, Germany
 Kalkurung Airport, an airport in Australia by IATA airport code
 Knattspyrnufélag Garðabæjar, an Icelandic association football club